Korel Engin (born April 8, 1980), aka Cori Enghusen, is an American-born Turkish female basketball player at the center position for Beşiktaş Cola Turka. At 201 cm (6'7"), she is the tallest member of the Turkish women's basketball national team.

Born in Bothell, Washington, Enghusen started playing basketball at the age of 12. She played for Inglemoor High School in Washington until her graduation in 1998. She was named "1998 Gatorade Washington State Player of the Year". While she studied sociology in major and psychology at Stanford University between 1998–2002, she played as center of the college team, the sixth-ranked women's basketball team in the NCAA.

Cori Enghusen was member of the US national team at the 2001 Basketball World University Games in Beijing, China. She helped lead the U.S. to gold at the Games.

In 2003, she played professionally in Greece. Then she moved to Turkey and was with Migrosspor in Istanbul in 2004. In 2005, she agreed to become a Turkish citizen in order to join the Turkey women's basketball national team and to participate at the 2005 Mediterranean Games in Almería, Spain. She helped Turkey earn gold medal. Engin signed a two-years contract with Fenerbahçe Istanbul in July 2005.

Honors
  Fenerbahçe Istanbul
Turkish League
Winners (1): 2005-06
Turkish Cup
Winners (1): 2005-06
  Galatasaray
Turkish Presidents Cup
Winners (1): 2007-08
EuroCup Women
Winners (1): 2008-09

See also
 Turkish women in sports

External links
Profile at tbl.org.tr

1980 births
Living people
American emigrants to Turkey
American women's basketball players
Basketball players from Washington (state)
Botaş SK players
Centers (basketball)
Fenerbahçe women's basketball players
Galatasaray S.K. (women's basketball) players
Mersin Büyükşehir Belediyesi women's basketball players
Migrosspor basketball players
Naturalized citizens of Turkey
People from Bothell, Washington
Stanford Cardinal women's basketball players
Turkish expatriate basketball people in Croatia
Turkish expatriate basketball people in Russia
Turkish people of American descent
Turkish women's basketball players
ŽKK Gospić players
Universiade gold medalists for the United States
Universiade medalists in basketball
United States women's national basketball team players
American expatriate basketball people in Russia
American expatriate basketball people in Croatia